The Gascoyne broad-blazed slider (Lerista gascoynensis)  is a species of skink found in Western Australia.

References

Lerista
Reptiles described in 1986
Taxa named by Glen Milton Storr